The 1898 Kentucky State College Blue and White football team represented Kentucky State College—now known as the University of Kentucky—during the 1898 Southern Intercollegiate Athletic Association football season. Led by first-year head coach W. R. Bass, the team, known as "the Immortals," was undefeated, untied, and unscored upon, posted a 7–0 record and outscored its opponents 181 to 0. The  game was stopped by rain after fifteen minutes of play.

Schedule

See also
 List of undefeated NCAA Division I football teams

References

Kentucky State College
Kentucky Wildcats football seasons
College football undefeated seasons
Kentucky State College Blue and White football